Alexander Jenkins (born April 12, 1958), known as J. Alexander or Miss J, is an American reality television personality and runway coach best known for his work on America's Next Top Model. He travels extensively for the fashion and modeling industries. Alexander lives in Paris and New York City.

Early life
Alexander was born in the South Bronx, New York City to Julius and Mary Jenkins and cites his mother as the first person to introduce him to fashion.

As a teenager, he turned to modeling when he met the president of Elite Model Management, Monique Pillard. Pillard was so impressed with his look that she signed him to her agency, and he walked for designer Jean Paul Gaultier in New York City. Alexander is openly gay. 
Alexander met Tyra Banks backstage at a runway show, and he began to give Banks walking lessons. Banks coined Alexander's title "Queen of the Catwalk".

Career
Alexander's career as a runway coach began accidentally; he would coach models backstage and eventually became recognized for his skills as a coach. He has been coaching and casting since 1991. He rose to prominence in this field when he coached supermodel Naomi Campbell and model Kimora Lee Simmons. He has also worked with models Nadja Auermann, Claudia Mason and Julia Stegner.

After a modeling stint in Tokyo, he eventually decided to settle in Paris and since 1991, has helped with casting and coaching models for well-known designers such as Hervé Léger, Lars Nilsson, Bill Blass, Valentino, John Galliano, Chanel, Alexander McQueen, and Nina Ricci.

Alexander travels globally for charity events and modeling competitions. His expertise is frequently sought after by journalists.

America's Next Top Model
Alexander appeared on every cycle of the television program America's Next Top Model as the runway coach to the contestants.  He was made a judge starting with Cycle 5. As of Cycle 14 of the show, Alexander was replaced as a permanent judge on the panel by Vogue editor at large André Leon Talley.  Alexander stayed on as the show's runway coach and has appeared in many of the international versions of the show.

Alexander's nickname "Miss J" (or "Siss' J" after the word sister) came from Cycle 1 contestant Robin Manning, who often confused Alexander and Jay Manuel and on several occasions referred to Alexander as "Miss J" by accident because of his flamboyant clothing (Alexander often dresses in drag and usually wears a skirt and high heels during runway walking training) and personality. Accordingly, Jay Manuel is referred to as "Mr. Jay", and ANTM contestants often call them "The Jays", "The Two Jays" or "Mr. and Miss. Jay" when they appear together.<ref name="Times">Denise Martin, A new platform for 'Top Model' pair'", The Los Angeles Times, November 21, 2008.</ref> In 2008, the Jays were cast in Operation Fabulous, a show to make over "plain Janes" similar to Queer Eye For The Straight Guy, also produced by Tyra Banks.Gina Scarpa, "America's Next Top Model: Tyra Banks Looks for a 'True Beauty'", Buddy TV,  November 10, 2008.

He has also appeared on international versions of Top Model, such as Canada's Next Top Model, Holland's Next Top Model, Korea's Next Top Model, Estonia's Next Top Model and Scandinavia's Next Top Model. Alexander appeared on the 4 May 2008 episode of Finland's version of ANTM Suomen huippumalli haussa. In 2009 and the 2011 final, Alexander appeared on Britain's Next Top Model.

On April 20, 2012, Alexander's contract with America's Next Top Model expired alongside photographer turned director Nigel Barker and Jay Manuel.

In May 2020, Alexander and Manuel began a weekly Instagram Live series, later syndicated to Facebook and YouTube, based on their experiences working on the show.

Designer
Alexander is also interested in designing and has handmade all his clothes on America’s Next Top Model with the exception of the nurse’s outfit: "I did make the hat and the bag." "All the dresses that you see me wear at the challenges, I actually sit down with a needle and thread, not even with a sewing machine, and make them all by hand. I made the ruffles and everything."

Personal life
Alexander has stated on The Tyra Banks Show that he has a son named Boris. Both Alexander and his ex-boyfriend donated sperm to a French lesbian who wanted a child, and Alexander's ex is the biological father.Watch Top Model's "Miss J" Reveal He's a Dad! - UsMagazine.com Alexander has said that he has a "very active role" in Boris' life. He has even joked that his "fashion genes" must have rubbed off on Boris.

In 2010, Alexander wrote Follow the Model: Miss J's Guide to Unleashing Presence, Poise, and Power, which "shares his story and offers tips on how to be more confident".

Alexander was featured in the track Jay Walk(feat. Miss Jay Alexander) on Leikeli47's album Shape Up (2022).

Awards and nominations

Publications
 Follow the Model: Miss J's Guide to Unleashing Presence, Poise, and Power'' (Simon & Schuster, 2010), 1439150516, 9781439150511.

See also
 LGBT culture in New York City
 List of LGBT people from New York City

References

External links

 
 

1958 births
American expatriates in France
African-American male models
African-American models
American male models
LGBT African Americans
Male models from New York (state)
Living people
Gay models
Participants in Canadian reality television series
Entertainers from the Bronx
LGBT people from New York (state)
21st-century African-American people
20th-century African-American people
Judges in American reality television series